The 2016 United Football League was the seventh and last season of the UFL since its establishment as a semi-professional league in 2009. Division 2 is disbanded for this season with all teams competing in one division.

The league competition which started on April 30 and ended on October 24 will followed a pure double round robin match with no play-offs.
For this edition the foreign player cap is reduced to four from five foreign players in a playing squad of 18 players, including 7 substitutes. At least one of the four maximum allowable foreign players must be from the Asian country. This was to align to the guidelines followed at the AFC Cup and AFC Champions League. However, a club with more than 25 players may have more than four foreign players in their whole squad provided that they comply with the 4-player foreign player limit rule during match day.

Global F.C. won the league with one game to spare.

The 2016 season was the last UFL season following the appointment of UFL President Randy Roxas as part of the task force for the upcoming Philippines Football League which had its inaugural season in 2017.

Venue
Matches are played at the Rizal Memorial Stadium.

Clubs
The league is composed of 12 clubs.

Managerial changes

League table

Positions by round

Results

Season statistics

Top goalscorers

Hat-tricks

4 Player scored four goals 5 Player scored five goals
6 Player scored six goals8 Player scored eight goals

Own goals

Honors
Player
Golden Boot: Adrián Gallardo (Ceres)
Golden Glove:  Nelson Gasic (JP Voltes)
Golden Ball:  Hikaru Minegishi (Global)
Best Midfielder:  Matthew Hartmann (Global)
Best Defender:  Masaki Yanagawa (JP Voltes)

Team
Fairplay: Stallion F.C.

References

External links
Official website

2016 United Football League (Philippines)
1
Phil
United Football League (Philippines) seasons